Przykory may refer to the following places:
Przykory, Garwolin County in Masovian Voivodeship (east-central Poland)
Przykory, Grójec County in Masovian Voivodeship (east-central Poland)
Przykory, Płock County in Masovian Voivodeship (east-central Poland)
Przykory, Wyszków County in Masovian Voivodeship (east-central Poland)